The Hebrew Cemetery in Richmond, Virginia, also known as Hebrew Burying Ground, dates from 1816.  This Jewish cemetery, one of the oldest in the United States, was founded in 1816 as successor to the Franklin Street Burial Grounds of 1789. Among those interred here is Josephine Cohen Joel, who was well known in the early 20th century as the founder of Richmond Art Co.  Within Hebrew Cemetery is a plot known as the
Soldier's Section. It contains the graves of 30 Jewish Confederate soldiers who died in or near Richmond.
It is one of only two Jewish military cemeteries outside of the State of Israel.

Located at Fourth and Hospital Streets on historic Shockoe Hill, it was listed on the National Register of Historic Places in 2006. It was listed a second time on the National Register of Historic Places on June 16, 2022 as part of the Shockoe Hill Burying Ground Historic District. The Hebrew Cemetery's northern extensions  as well as the Hebrew Cemetery Annex are also part of the Shockoe Hill African Burying Ground.

The Hebrew Cemetery is maintained by Congregation Beth Ahabah, a Reform congregation founded in Richmond in 1789.

Cemetery for Hebrew Confederate Soldiers

Within the Hebrew Cemetery is the Cemetery for Hebrew Confederate Soldiers. Along with a cemetery for Jewish veterans of World War I located in Weissensee, Berlin, it is the only Jewish military cemetery not located in Israel. The cemetery is on historic Shockoe Hill, and is also maintained by Congregation Beth Ahabah.

References

External links

 Hebrew Cemetery Richmond
 
 
 
 Preliminry Information Form (PIF) for Historic Districts, "Shockoe Hill Burying Ground" (127-7231)
 DHR Virginia Department of Historic Resources, 127-7231 Shockoe Hill Burying Ground Historic District

1816 establishments in Virginia
Cemeteries in Richmond, Virginia
Cemeteries on the National Register of Historic Places in Virginia
Historic districts on the National Register of Historic Places in Virginia
Jewish cemeteries in Virginia
 
Jews and Judaism in Richmond, Virginia
National Register of Historic Places in Richmond, Virginia